Triplarina volcanica is a species of flowering plant in the myrtle family, Myrtaceae and is endemic to Queensland, where it is only found in three mountainous areas. It is a shrub with elliptical to egg-shaped leaves with the narrower end towards the base and flowers with five sepals, five white petals and fourteen to sixteen stamens.

Description

Taxonomy and naming
Triplarina volcanica was first formally described by Anthony Bean in 1995 and the description was published in the journal Austrobaileya from specimens he collected near Mount Beerburrum in the Glass House Mountains in 1993. 

In the same journal, Bean described two subspecies and the names are accepted by the Australian Plant Census:

The specific epithet (volcanica) refers to the rocks on which this species grows, and the epithet borealis means "northern", referring to the more northerly distribution of this subspecies.

Distribution and habitat
This triplarina occurs in a few mountainous areas in eastern Queensland where it grows in heath. Subspecies borealis occurs on Mount Walsh and Biggenden Bluff, near Biggenden and subspecies volcanica is endemic to the Glass House Mountains.

Conservation status
Triplarina volcanica is classified as of "least concern" under the Queensland Government Nature Conservation Act 1992.

Use in horticulture
Subspecies volcanica is sometimes cultivated as Baeckea camphorata.

References

volcanica
Flora of Queensland
Plants described in 1995
Taxa named by Anthony Bean